Deschampsia antarctica, the Antarctic hair grass, is one of two flowering plants native to Antarctica, the other being Colobanthus quitensis (Antarctic pearlwort).

They mainly occur on the South Orkney Islands, the South Shetland Islands, and along the western Antarctic Peninsula. A recent warming trend has increased germination, and thus number of seedlings and plants, also extending their range southward to cover larger areas; reports indicate a twenty-fivefold increase in their number.

Deschampsia antarctica has been recorded by the Guinness Book of World Records as the southernmost flowering plant. In 1981, a specimen was found on the Antarctic Peninsula's Refuge Islands at a latitude of 68°21′S.

Since 2009, both D. antarctica and C. quitensis have been spreading rapidly, which studies suggest has been the result of rising air temperatures and a reduction in the number of fur seals.

See also
 Antarctic flora

References

External links 
 
 
 Plants in Antarctica 
 Pearlwort & Hairgrass picture 
 Anatomy of hairgrass

antarctica
Flora of central Chile
Flora of southern Chile
Flora of Northwest Argentina
Flora of South Argentina
Flora of Antarctica
Flora of the subantarctic islands